Henry S. Clark Jr. (January 19, 1904 – February 6, 1999) was an American Hall of Fame horse trainer. In 2007, Henry Clark was part of the inaugural class inducted into Delaware Park Racetrack's Wall of Fame.

Henry Clark was the grandson of William Jennings Sr. who bred, raced and trained Dunboyne to win the 1887 Preakness Stakes.

Clark began his professional career in 1929 and got his first stakes winner with Liz Whitney Tippett's colt, Blue Cypress. He worked well into his nineties and holds the record for most wins by a trainer in the Delaware Handicap with four.

References

1904 births
1999 deaths
American horse trainers
United States Thoroughbred Racing Hall of Fame inductees